Tommy Douglas Secondary School (TDSS) is a secondary education facility in Woodbridge, Ontario, Canada that opened on 3 February 2015. It is named after Tommy Douglas, the seventh Premier of Saskatchewan whose government implemented North America's first single-payer, universal health care program. It is a secular public school administered by the York Region District School Board. The school is located at 4020 Major Mackenzie Drive, and its first principal is Ann Pace from 2015-2020. As of now the current principal is Sandra Sardone from 2020-present. The school day runs from 8:10 to 2:25.

Before the school's opening, students attended Emily Carr Secondary School and Woodbridge College. At Woodbridge College, it operates as a "parallel, but separate" school, during which time the building at Woodbridge College is shared by two schools with separate staff and student body. It had previously maintained an office at Maple High School.

The school's boundary was approved by the YRDSB executive in January 2002, during which boundary changes for the opening of Emily Carr Secondary School and Maple High School were also approved. Because of unanticipated demographic changes in Vaughan, the school had one fewer feeder school than originally forecast by YRDSB planners. The school's boundaries are Highway 400 to the east, Rutherford Road to the south, Pine Valley Drive to the west, and the King-Vaughan town line in the north. Before opening, students residing south of Teston Road and north of Major Mackenzie Drive attended Woodbridge College, except those southwest of the area delimited by Millwood Parkway.

See also
Emily Carr Secondary School
Woodbridge College
York Region District School Board
List of high schools in Ontario

References

External links
Tommy Douglas Secondary School

Tommy Douglas Secondary School at York Region District School Board

York Region District School Board
High schools in the Regional Municipality of York
Education in Vaughan
2015 establishments in Ontario
Educational institutions established in 2015